The Madonna della Vittoria is a painting by the Italian Renaissance painter Andrea Mantegna; the painting was executed in 1496.

History
On 6 July 1495 the French army of Charles VIII of France, retreating from Italy after the French Invasion of 1494-1498, fought the Italic League at the Battle of Fornovo.  The League, commanded by Francesco II Gonzaga, Marquess of Mantua, was made up of numerous nation-states determined to prevent French dominance in Italy, and included the Holy Roman Empire, Spain, Venice, Milan, and the Papal States controlled by Pope Alexander VI. Despite the League failing in its goal to destroy the French army, taking more casualties at Fornovo, and allowing Charles VIII to retreat back to France with his army intact, Francesco claimed victory. As a sign of his self-proclaimed victory at Fornovo, he commissioned Mantegna to paint the Madonna della Vittoria.

During Francesco's absence from Mantua, Daniele da Norsa, a Jewish banker, had purchased a house in the city's San Simone quarter and replaced the image of the Virgin Mary which decorated its façade with his own coat of arms. The regent, Sigismondo Gonzaga, ordered him to restore the depiction. Although Daniele agreed to do so, the populace, inflamed by anti-semitic feeling, destroyed his house.

When Francesco returned, he forced Daniele to fund a chapel and a devotional painting. The painting was to be executed by the Mantuan court painter, Mantegna, and was inaugurated in 1496 on the anniversary of the duke's victory at Fornovo. The work was placed in the church of Santa Maria della Vittoria, which had been constructed over the ruins of Daniele da Norsa's house.

The painting was one of the artworks looted by the French during the Napoleonic invasion of Italy, and by 1798 was being exhibited in the Louvre. The painting was never returned; the given excuse was that its large size made the transport difficult. The presence of a sulphur-crested cockatoo in the painting is considered as evidence of Arab trade in the Australasian region with the bird being a gift from Sultan al-Kamil to Frederick II.

Description

The altarpiece shows Francesco Gonzaga paying homage to Mary, who sits on a high throne decorated with marbles intarsias and bas-reliefs. The base of the throne, with lion paws, has, within a medallion, the inscription "" (Queen of Heaven, rejoice, Alleluia); it lies on a circular basement with a bas-relief of the "Original Sin" and other stories from the Book of Genesis which are partly obscured by the praying figures. The throne's back has a large solar disc, decorated with weavings and vitreous pearls.

The child Jesus, who holds two red flowers (symbols of the Passion) and Mary look at Francesco Gonzaga, who is kneeling and has a grateful and smiling expression while receiving their blessing. The protection given to Gonzaga during the battle is also symbolized by Mary's mantle, which partially covers his head. Opposite to the donor are St. John the Baptist with a cross featuring the usual cartouche saying "" (Behold the Lamb of God, which takes away the sins of the world), and his mother, St. Elizabeth, protector of Isabella d'Este, wife of Francesco Gonzaga. The choice of St. Elizabeth in the place of a patron may have been chosen as a message of judgement to the Norsa who were made to pay for the work as a penalty for removing an image of the Madonna from their home.  Unlike the Norsa, St. Elizabeth who is represented as a Jewess in a yellow turban, was said to be the first to recognize the sanctity of Mary.

At the sides are two couples of standing saints: in the foreground are two military saints, the archangel St. Michael with a sword and St. Longinus with a broken spear, donning richly decorated armors; behind them are St. Andrew, patron saint of Mantua, with a long stick with the cross and St. George, another military saint, with a helmet and a long red lance.

The scene is set in an apse formed by a pergola of leaves, flowers and fruits, with several birds; the pergola's frame has at the top a shell (an attribute of the Virgin as new Venus), from which hang threads of coral pearls and rock crystal, as well as a large piece of red coral, another hint to the Passion of Jesus. The parrot is a comment on the birth of Jesus.

Notes

Sources

References

External links

La Vierge de la Victoire, Louvre 

1496 paintings
Paintings in the Louvre by Italian artists
Paintings of the Madonna and Child by Andrea Mantegna
Paintings depicting Michael (archangel)
Paintings depicting Andrew the Apostle
Paintings of Saint George (martyr)
Gonzaga art collection
Paintings of Elizabeth (biblical figure)